The following is an incomplete list of association football clubs based in Madagascar.
For a complete list see :Category:Football clubs in Madagascar

A
Academie Ny Antsika
AS Adema
Ajesaia
AS Fortior

C
CNaPS Sport

F
FC Ihosy
Fitarikandro

J
Japan Actuel's FC

S
SO l'Emyrne
Sistema

T
Tana FC Formation
TCO Boeny

U
USCA Foot
USJF Ravinala

 
Madagascar
Football
Football clubs